This is a list of notable quarries, worldwide.

In Australia:
Bombo Headland Quarry Geological Site
Boogardie quarry
Boya, Western Australia
Cronulla sand dunes
Moorooduc Quarry Flora and Fauna Reserve
Mount Gibraltar Trachyte Quarries Complex
Portland Cement Works Precinct
Prospect Hill (New South Wales)
Seaham Quarry
Statham's Quarry

In Canada:
Butchart Gardens
Connolly's quarry
Don Valley Brick Works
French Fort Cove
Hammerstone Project
Mary's Point
Miron Quarry
Queenston
Walcott Quarry

In Germany:
Cotta Sandstone
Elbe Sandstone
Grillenburg Sandstone
Hohburg Hills
Königshain Hills
Kriemhildenstuhl
Mühlsteinbrüche
Posta Sandstone
Reinhardtsdorf Sandstone
Waldenecksee
Wunsiedel Marble

In Italy:
Carrara, source of white marble including the block from which Michelangelo's David was carved

In Kosovo:
Çikatovë e Vjeter
Korroticë e Epërme

In Russia
Ruskeala

In the United Kingdom
See :Category:Quarries in the United Kingdom

In the United States:

See also
List of lime kilns, many being near limestone quarries

References